"Good Lovin" is a song performed by Alcazar and produced by Jonas von der Burg. It was co-written by Therese Grankvist, Anoo Bhagavan and Niklas von der Burg as a follow-up to their 2014 Melodifestivalen entry "Blame It on the Disco" earlier that year.

Music video
The lyric video for the song was released on July 15, 2014.

Track listings
Download single
"Good Lovin" (Radio Edit) - 3:09

Good Lovin Remixes
"Good Lovin" (Nasti & Clarks Remix) - 5:31
"Good Lovin" (Around the Globe Remix) - 4:19
"Good Lovin" (Ninjaneers Remix) - 3:46
"Good Lovin" (SoundFactory Club Mix) - 8:42
"Good Lovin" (Extended) - 6:33

Release history

References

External links
Alcazar official website
Discogs

Alcazar (band) songs
2014 songs
2014 singles
English-language Swedish songs
Songs written by Niklas von der Burg
Songs written by Anoo Bhagavan
Songs written by Therese Grankvist
Warner Music Group singles